The Maple Shade School District is a comprehensive community public school district that serves students in pre-kindergarten through twelfth grade from Maple Shade Township, in Burlington County, New Jersey, United States.

As of the 2021–22 school year, the district, comprised of four schools, had an enrollment of 2,370 students and 219.0 classroom teachers (on an FTE basis), for a student–teacher ratio of 10.8:1.

The district is classified by the New Jersey Department of Education as being in District Factor Group "CD", the sixth highest of eight groupings. District Factor Groups organize districts statewide to allow comparison by common socioeconomic characteristics of the local districts. From lowest socioeconomic status to highest, the categories are A, B, CD, DE, FG, GH, I and J.

History
Prior to the opening of Maple Shade High School in 1972, the township's students had been sent for 40 years to Merchantville High School in neighboring Camden County. With the loss of Maple Shade students, Merchantville closed its high school after the end of the 1971-72 school year and started sending its students to Pennsauken High School for grades nine through twelve.

Schools
Schools in the district (with 2021–22 enrollment data from the National Center for Education Statistics) are:
Elementary schools
Howard R. Yocum Elementary School with 565 students in grades PreK to 1
Yvonne Reitz, Principal
Maude M. Wilkins Elementary School with 534 students in grades 2-4
Steve Ormsby, Principal
Ralph J. Steinhauer Elementary School with 342 students in grades 5-6
Christopher Edwards, Principal
High school
Maple Shade High School with 888 students in grades 7-12
Matthew LaGrou, Principal

Administration
Core members of the district's administration are:
Beth Norcia, Superintendent
Michael Blake, Business Administrator / Board Secretary

Board of education
The district's board of education, comprised of nine members, sets policy and oversees the fiscal and educational operation of the district through its administration. As a Type II school district, the board's trustees are elected directly by voters to serve three-year terms of office on a staggered basis, with three seats up for election each year held (since 2012) as part of the November general election. The board appoints a superintendent to oversee the district's day-to-day operations and a business administrator to supervise the business functions of the district.

References

External links
Maple Shade School District
 
Data for the Maple Shade School District, National Center for Education Statistics

Maple Shade Township, New Jersey
New Jersey District Factor Group CD
School districts in Burlington County, New Jersey